Proton is a compatibility layer for Windows games to run on Linux-based operating systems. Proton is developed by Valve in cooperation with developers from CodeWeavers. It is a collection of software and libraries combined with a patched version of Wine to improve performance and compatibility with Windows games. Proton is designed for integration into the Steam client as "Steam Play". It is officially distributed through the client, although third party forks can be manually installed.

Overview 
Proton was initially released on 21 August 2018. Upon release, Valve announced a whitelist of 27 games that were tested and certified to perform like their native Windows counterparts without requiring end-user tweaking. These include Doom (2016), Quake, and Final Fantasy VI.

Proton incorporates several libraries that improve 3D performance. These include Direct3D-to-Vulkan translation layers, namely DXVK for Direct3D 9, 10 and 11, and VKD3D-Proton for Direct3D 12. A separate library known as D9VK handled Direct3D 9 support until it was merged into DXVK in December 2019.

Compatibility 
Being a fork of Wine, Proton maintains very similar compatibility with Windows applications as its upstream counterpart. In addition to the official whitelist, many other Windows games are compatible, albeit unofficially, with Proton. The user can optionally force use of Proton for a specific title, even if a Linux version already exists.

ProtonDB 
ProtonDB is an unofficial community website that collects and displays crowdsourced data describing the compatibility of a given title with Proton, on a rating scale from "Borked" to "Platinum". The site is inspired by the WineHQ AppDB, which also collects and displays crowdsourced compatibility reports and uses a similar rating system.

Release history 
Valve has released seven major versions of Proton. The versioning scheme refers to the upstream Wine version it's based on, with an appended patch number.

Proton generally lags behind its upstream Wine base by several releases. Unofficial forks, such as Proton GE, have been created to re-base Proton on recent Wine versions, which may improve compatibility with games over the official release, and sometimes hurt it.

In December 2020, Valve released Proton Experimental, a perpetual beta branch of Proton that incorporates new features and bug fixes quicker than regular releases, which are eventually included in a regular release.

The Steam Deck uses Proton to increase software title compatibility.

See also 
SteamOS
Steam Deck

References

External links 
 ProtonDB – community database for game compatibility data

2018 software
Compatibility layers
Software derived from or incorporating Wine
Software using the BSD license
Steam (service)